Woollett is a surname of English origin and may refer to:

 Alan Woollett, British football player
 Charlie Woollett (1920–2011), British football player
 Henry Winslow Woollett (1895–1969), British World War I flying ace
 Tony Woollett (1927–2004), British cricketer
 Walter "Babe" Woollett (1906–1998), prominent figure of Canadian aviation
 William Woollett (1735–1785), British engraver